The following is a list of mountain passes in Pakistan:

List of famous Passes

References 
It is situated in Koh e sufaid mountain ranges
 Babusar Pass connect Khyber Pakhtunkhwa to Gilgit Baltistan 4,173 m (13,691 ft)
 Bashkaro Pass 4,924 m (16,155 ft)
 Bolan Pass connects Sibi with Quetta 1,793.4 m (5,884 ft)
 Burzil Pass 4,100 m (13,451 ft)
 Mustagh Pass 6,013-meter (19,728 ft)
 Broghil Pass Pass to Afghanistan 3,798 m (12,460 ft)

 Chaprot Pass 4,900 m (16,076 ft)
 Peiwar Pass

 Dorah Pass chitral to Afghanistan 4,300 m (14,108 ft)
 Gondogoro Pass 5,585 metres (18,323 ft)
 Gumal Pass Dera Ismail khan with Ghazni(Afghanistan)
 Hayal Pass 4,700 m (15,420 ft)
 Hispar Pass 5,128 m (16,824 ft)
 Irshad Pass to Afghanistan
 Karakar Pass 4,977 m (16,329 ft)
 Khojak Pass 2,290 m (7,512 ft)
 Khunjerab Pass connects Pakistan with  China 4,693 m (15,397 ft)
 Khyber PassPakistan with to Afghanistan 1,070 m (3,510 ft)
 Khurram Pass to Afghanistan
 Kilik Pass to China 4,827 metres (15,837 ft)
 Kohat Pass
 Lowari Pass connects Chitral with Dir 3,118 m (10,230 ft)
 Lupghar Pir Pass to Afghanistan 5,190 m (17,030 ft)
 Malakand Pass peshawar with chitral 1,362 m (4,468 ft)
 Mintaka Pass to China 4,709 metres (15,449 ft)
 Naltar Pass Karakoram Range, 4,600 m (15,092 ft)
 Badawi Pass 3,523m
 Shandur Top karakram range 3,700 m (12,139 ft)
 Tochi Pass Connects with Waziristan with KP
Banu( Pakistan) to ghazni (Afghanistan)
 Naltar Pass in  4600m
 Didrilli Pass connects KPK to Gilgit (Handrap Lake), 5030m
 Zargar Pass Gilgit with china
 Murtagh Pass Baltistan with Yarkand (China)

Pakistan
Mountain passes